Donald Thomas Lutz III (born February 6, 1989) is an American-German former professional baseball first baseman / leftfielder. He signed with the Reds as a non-drafted amateur free agent in 2007. Despite starting his baseball career in his teenage years, and in Germany, Lutz first visited Cincinnati's spring training camp, reached Class AA and was placed on the Reds 40-man roster in 2012.

Lutz was the first German-developed player to play in the modern Major Leagues. He played for Team Germany in the 2019 European Baseball Championship, in which they came in 6th.

Playing career
Lutz was still a baby when his family moved to Germany. He had his first experience with the sport at 14, when his older brother took him to a training session of the Friedberg Braves, a team located in Friedberg (Hessen). Since then, Lutz has rapidly increased his skills, especially his powerful hitting that made him so successful. After two years with the local team, he went to the Bad Homburg Hornets and played there for two seasons before he went to a baseball boarding school in Regensburg for one more season.

Cincinnati Reds
Within another few years, he became a member of the Germany national baseball team and traveled to Europe-wide training camps, which finally led to his signing with the Cincinnati Reds on July 15, 2007.

Lutz played his first two seasons for the former Gulf Coast League affiliate of the Reds. In those seasons he played 50 games and achieved a .250 BA with one home run and 19 RBIs in the first season, while only scoring a .169 BA, 10 RBIs and no home runs the following year. In his third season Lutz remained in the Rookie level but was transferred to the Billings Mustangs from the Pioneer League, where he had a .286 BA as well as 7 home runs and 28 RBIs.

After an impressive 2011 season for the single-A Dayton Dragons with a .301 BA and 20 home runs and the team's first cycle, Lutz was promoted to the Reds 40-man roster in 2012 and participated in 15 Spring training games. Only a few days before opening day he was dropped from the active roster and sent to advanced-A affiliate Bakersfield Blaze. There he played a not less impressive season than the one before. Until mid-July he made 63 appearances and batted a massive 17 home runs and 51 RBIs. After being promoted to double-A Pensacola Blue Wahoos Lutz continued with nearly the same statistics. Although playing in the Arizona Fall League and a second spring training with the Reds, Lutz started the 2013 season in Pensacola but remained on the 40-man roster.

The Reds promoted Lutz to the Major Leagues on April 29, 2013. On May 5, 2013, against Shawn Camp of the Chicago Cubs, Lutz got his first MLB hit when he lined a ball into center field. Lutz also went on to score that inning, and registered an RBI and stolen base later in the same game. Lutz hit his first career home run on May 12, 2013, a three-run homer off Brewers pitcher Wily Peralta. He was sent back down to Pensacola on June 25, 2013.

On April 21, 2014, he hit for the first cycle in Blue Wahoos franchise history in a 17-1 win against the Jacksonville Suns.

On May 1, 2015 it was announced Lutz would undergo Tommy John surgery and would be out for the season. He was released on June 3, 2015.

Bravos De Leon
On March 30, 2017, Lutz signed with the Bravos de León of the Mexican Baseball League.  He was released on April 12, 2017.

Kansas City T-Bones
On May 4, 2017, Lutz signed with the Kansas City T-Bones of the American Association. He was released on May 17, 2017.

Brisbane Bandits
Lutz commenced his comeback from injury with the Brisbane Bandits in the ABL for the 2015-16 season, where his 3/7 in the 2016 Australian Baseball League postseason led to him being named Championship Series MVP and helping the Bandits to their first league championship.

The following season, he played in a more limited capacity trying to break back into affiliated baseball from injuries, but still hit .323/.405/.600 across 19 games through the middle of the 2016-17 season. 

Lutz rejoined the Bandits full-time for the 2017-18 Australian Baseball League season where he broke the single season homerun record with teammate T. J. Bennett with 16. The Bandits went on to win their third consecutive ABL title.

Following the conclusion of the 2017-18 season, he announced his retirement as a player, and later signed on as the new hitting coach of the Arizona League Reds for the 2018 season.

On September 6, 2018, Lutz came out of retirement to play again for Brisbane in the 2018-19 Australian Baseball League season. He had a relatively lean season, slashing .186/.312/.310, but was key in Brisbane's postseason run, going 4/10 with three homeruns to help the Bandits to their fourth successive championship.

Coaching career
, Lutz was the hitting coach for the Arizona League Reds.

References

External links

1989 births
Living people
2019 European Baseball Championship players
American emigrants to Germany
American expatriate baseball players in Australia
American expatriate baseball players in Mexico
American people of German descent
Arizona League Reds players
Bakersfield Blaze players
Baseball coaches from New York (state)
Baseball players from New York (state)
Billings Mustangs players
Bravos de León players
Brisbane Bandits players
Canberra Cavalry players
Cincinnati Reds players
Dayton Dragons players
German baseball players
German expatriate sportspeople in Mexico
German people of American descent
German sports coaches
Gulf Coast Reds players
Louisville Bats players
Major League Baseball first basemen
Major League Baseball left fielders
Major League Baseball players from Germany
Major League Baseball right fielders
Mexican League baseball first basemen
Minor league baseball coaches
Pensacola Blue Wahoos players
Peoria Javelinas players
Sportspeople from Watertown, New York
Yaquis de Obregón players